Oak was an English folk band in the early 1970s.

History
The members of Oak met in the 1960s in Kingston upon Thames, where Rod Stradling ran a folk club. The Stradlings moved to Camden Town in 1968 and became involved in running another folk club in Islington. Engle and Webb also moved to North London soon afterward. In 1970, while Rod Stradling's wife, Danny was pregnant, Rod Stradling played together with Tony Engle as a successful duo and as part of The Garland, replacing Mel Dean. After the birth of their son, the Stradlings and Engle and Webb joined forces as Oak and performed at most of the folk clubs in the London area.

They were asked by Bill Leader to make an LP for his Trailer label  but as Engle worked for Topic Records, he felt obliged to offer to record for them first. To his surprise, the offer was accepted and Welcome to Our Fair was recorded on May Day, 1971. The record created interest and the band played 163 gigs in the 18 months between the record's release and their final performance, on 19 December 1972.

Later work
Rod and Danny Stradling went on to form The Cotswold Liberation Front, which later became the Old Swan Band. After a few years, they left The Old Swan Band, and Rod Stradling recorded with the English Country Blues Band, the English Country Dance Band, Tiger Moth, and Edward II and the Red Hot Polkas. He is currently the editor of Musical Traditions.

Peta Webb, whose individual vocal style was influenced by Irish traditional singers (especially Margaret Barry, Sarah Makem, and Sarah and Rita Keane), released a solo album, I have wandered in Exile, in 1973. She recorded with Scottish singer Alison McMorland in 1980. In the early 1980s, she and Tony Engle were members of Alan Ward's Tex-Mex band The Armadillos. Webb has recorded with the Watersons, was part of Sisters Unlimited in the 1980s and 90s, and has formed her own band, Webb's Wonders. She performs as a resident singer at the Musical Traditions folk club in London; she was also until 2011 an assistant librarian of the Vaughan Williams Memorial Library at Cecil Sharp House, headquarters of the English Folk Dance and Song Society.

Tony Engle has produced many classic folk recordings for Topic Records and played on several of them as a session musician. As of 2011 he was managing director of Topic Records.

Personnel
 Tony Engle (voice, Anglo concertina, fiddle, bones)
 Danny Stradling (voice, tambourine)
 Rod Stradling (voice, melodeons)
 Peta Webb (voice, fiddle)

Discography
 Welcome to Our Fair, Topic Records, 12TS212 (1971)
 Country Songs and Music, Musical Traditions, MTCD327-8 (2003) (includes tracks from Welcome to Our Fair and other archive recordings)

References

External links
 A history of "Oak", with track listings and full lyrics of the traditional songs they recorded
 Review of The Magpie's Nest
 Review of As Close as Can Be
 A history of Topic Records

English folk musical groups